Archisepsis is a genus of flies in the family Sepsidae.

Species
Archisepsis armata (Schiner, 1868)
Archisepsis bolivica Ozerov, 2004
Archisepsis discolor (Bigot, 1857)
Archisepsis diversiformis (Ozerov, 1993)
Archisepsis ecalcarata (Thomson, 1869)
Archisepsis hirsutissima Silva, 1993
Archisepsis peruana (Ozerov, 1994)
Archisepsis pleuralis (Coquillett, 1904)
Archisepsis polychaeta (Ozerov, 1993)
Archisepsis priapus Silva, 1993
Archisepsis pusio (Schiner, 1868)
Archisepsis umbrifer (Schiner, 1868)

References

Sepsidae
Diptera of North America
Diptera of South America
Brachycera genera